Saleem Elahi (Urdu: سلیم الہی, born 21 November 1976) is a former Pakistani cricketer who played 13 Test matches and 48 One Day Internationals between 1995 and 2004. Making his international debut against Sri Lanka in September 1995, he made 102 not out, thus becoming the first player from Pakistan to score a century on ODI debut.

Considered a limited-overs specialist, Elahi averages 36.17 in ODIs and 52.30 in List A cricket. In 28 of the 48 ODIs that he had played as an opener he averaged 42, the best for a Pakistani. He had limited success in first-class cricket averaging just 32.

Personal life 
Born in 1976 in Sahiwal, Punjab, Pakistan, Elahi has two older brothers—Manzoor Elahi and Zahoor Elahi, both of whom represented the Pakistan cricket team.

International career
Despite not playing first-class cricket, Elahi was selected for the home series against Sri Lanka in 1995–96. In the first of the three-match One Day International series played at Gujranwala, he scored 102 not out off 133 balls thus becoming the first player from Pakistan to score a century on ODI debut; at age nineteen, he remains the youngest cricketer to do so as of July 2015. His man of the match-winning innings helped Pakistan secure a nine-wicket victory. He scored 77 runs in the next two games, thus accumulating 179 runs in the series. He was then selected to play in the Singer Champions Trophy in Sharjah the same year.

With continued success in both the tournaments, Elahi was picked up for the Test series against Australia in November 1995. In two Tests, he managed to score 43 runs at an average of 10.75. Following that, he was intermittently selected and dropped from the side. Between his debut and 2002, Elahi played 13 Tests for Pakistan scoring 436 runs at an average of 18.95. Contrary to his success in ODIs, he managed just one half-century and six ducks, including a pair, in Test cricket. With the exception of a series in England in 2000, where he averaged 44.40, he failed to average more than 20 in any of the series'.

Towards the tail end of 2002, when Pakistan toured Zimbabwe and South Africa, he scored three centuries in four games. In one of those matches, in 2002 against South Africa, he made his highest score of 135. In the match, he shared a partnership of 257 runs with Abdul Razzaq for the second wicket to help Pakistan reach 335 runs. He was eventually selected for the 2003 World Cup. In four matches he scored 102 runs, crossing half-century once. Post World Cup, he represented Pakistan in two tournaments after which he was dropped from both the Test and ODI squads.

References

External links 
 

1976 births
Cricketers at the 1998 Commonwealth Games
Cricketers at the 2003 Cricket World Cup
Cricketers who made a century on One Day International debut
Habib Bank Limited cricketers
Lahore cricketers
Lahore Blues cricketers
Lahore City cricketers
Lahore Whites cricketers
Living people
Pakistani cricketers
Pakistan One Day International cricketers
Pakistan Test cricketers
United Bank Limited cricketers
Cricketers from Sahiwal
Commonwealth Games competitors for Pakistan